The 2003 Ukrainian Figure Skating Championships were the national championships of 2002–03 figure skating season. Skaters competed in the disciplines of men's singles, ladies' singles, pair skating, and ice dancing on the senior level. The results were used to choose the teams to the 2003 World Championships and the 2003 European Championships.

Results

Men

Ladies

Pairs

Ice dancing

External links
 results

Ukrainian Figure Skating Championships
2002 in figure skating
Ukrainian Figure Skating Championships, 2003
2002 in Ukrainian sport
2003 in Ukrainian sport